Apartado de correos 1001 is a 1950 Spanish crime film directed by Julio Salvador.

Plot
Young Rafael was murdered in the street in front of the Police Headquarters in Barcelona. Miguel and Marcial, two agents of the Criminal Brigade in charge of the investigation, are, in the room of the deceased, a copy of " La Vanguardia " , in which they are appointed an ad asking for a manager for a chemical company, by payment of a strong bond, and the indication for more information write to PO Box 1001. This unique track leading to the arrest of the murderer

Production 
Initially, the film was going to be directed by Antonio Román, with Julio Salvador as assistant director. Finally, Román went on to direct another film from the same production company, The past threatens, and thus Salvador was the director of Post office box 1001.

The film is loosely based on real events: behind an ambiguous job offer published in an advertisement for La Vanguardia, a plot was hidden to defraud the unwary who responded to said offer. According to the policeman Gil Llamas, the work of the scriptwriters "was limited to handling the known data, seasoning them with the inevitable love story and with a certain murder perpetrated in front of the Superior Police Headquarters."

The film opens with a chain of images of Barcelona and a voiceover from the narrator, whose text is quoted below, expressing the authors' intention of realism and giving the film an air of semidocumentary.

Cast
Tomás Blanco
Modesto Cid
Manuel de Juan
Elena Espejo
Emilio Fábregas
Ricardo Fuentes
José Goula
Marta Grau
Casimiro Hurtado
Guillermo Marín
Carlos Muñoz
Luis Pérez de León
Conrado San Martín
Eugenio Testa

References

External links
 

1950 films
1950s Spanish-language films
Spanish black-and-white films
Spain in fiction
Films set in Barcelona
1950 crime films
Spanish crime films
1950s Spanish films